Cordylancistrus daguae is a species of catfish in the family Loricariidae. It is native to South America, where it occurs in the Dagua River basin in Colombia for which it is named. The species reaches 9.5 cm (3.7 inches) in total length.

References 

Ancistrini
Fish described in 1912